"Notice Me" is a song by American hip hop group Migos featuring fellow American rapper Post Malone. It was released on January 26, 2018 from Migos' second studio album Culture II. The song was produced by FKi 1st.

Critical reception
In a review of Culture II, Alphonse Pierre of The Fader wrote, "On the FKI-produced 'Notice Me,' which features a seemingly leftover Post Malone chorus, Takeoff delivers one of Culture II's strongest verses, as he patiently keeps pace with the drowsy beat before suddenly diving into the triplet flow that he's always been the best at employing ("Sippin a tea, packin the heat, niggas that lookin for me")."

Charts

Certifications

References

2018 songs
Migos songs
Post Malone songs
Songs written by Quavo
Songs written by Offset (rapper)
Songs written by Takeoff (rapper)
Songs written by Post Malone
Songs written by FKi 1st